The Night Listener is a 2006 American psychological thriller film directed by Patrick Stettner and starring Robin Williams. The screenplay by Armistead Maupin, Terry Anderson, and Stettner is based on Maupin's 2000 novel The Night Listener, which was inspired by Anthony Godby Johnson.

Plot
Gabriel Noone, a popular gay New York City radio show host, is dealing with a separation from his partner, Jess. Noone is given a memoir written by teenager Pete Logand, which chronicles the many years of sexual abuse he suffered at the hands of his parents and their friends. Diagnosed with AIDS, the youth has been adopted by Donna Logand, the social worker who handled his case.

Noone begins a telephone relationship with the boy and Donna. He and Pete become increasingly close and form a father-son relationship, much to the dismay of Jess, especially after he speaks to Donna and suspects that she was impersonating Pete in some of the telephone conversations. Noone's personal secretary Anna adds fuel to the fire by discussing her research into people who fabricate elaborate stories to get attention. Determined to prove the boy exists and his story is true, Noone decides to pay a surprise visit to Pete in his hometown in rural Wisconsin. Noone discovers the return address on Pete's correspondence is actually a mail drop. Soon after, while eating in a local diner, he overhears another patron and recognizes her voice as that of Donna. He is stunned to learn that she is blind and uses a guide dog. Noone follows her home and Donna senses he has followed her. She invites him into her home and talks openly about Pete, who she says is currently in the hospital undergoing tests. She assures him he can visit the boy the following day, then suddenly becomes angry and tells him she will not allow him to meet Pete. Increasingly suspicious, Noone contacts all the hospitals in Madison, the location of the nearest facilities, but none have the boy registered as a patient.

Noone's paranoia about the boy's existence grows and, hoping to find proof of his existence, he breaks into Donna's home. A police officer arrests him for breaking and entering and then, mistakenly believing Noone to be one of the boy's abusers, attacks him with a stun baton before taking him to the station. Noone convinces the police he meant no harm and is released, only to find Donna waiting for him with the news that Pete is dead; also, that he was in a Milwaukee hospital, and was never in Madison. Distressed that Noone doesn't believe her, Donna collapses in the middle of a road and tries to hold him with her in the path of an oncoming truck. She then moves everything out of her home and disappears before the police can question her. Noone is now convinced that the boy is a figment of the deranged woman's imagination.

In response to a phone call from Donna, Noone goes to a motel where she was staying, and finds Pete's stuffed rabbit and a videotape under a blanket. He plays the video of a child, who seems to be Pete, but who could have been anyone. The phone rings and the caller claims to be the boy (but sounds exactly like Donna now), waiting for his mother at the airport. The caller ends the conversation after Noone asks what happened in Donna's past and how she became blind and that Donna should get help. Noone just watches the video, deep in thought.

Noone returns to Manhattan and uses his experience to create The Night Listener, a new radio story. In the final scene, Donna is searching for a new home in a coastal town, telling the realtor she needs it for herself and her son, who has just lost his leg but will be released the next day. She has drastically changed her appearance and no longer has a guide dog or dark glasses, revealing her blindness was also an act. Gabriel concludes his show for the night by saying, "As for Pete, there's a line in the Velveteen Rabbit that reads... Real isn't how you were made. It's the thing that happens to you. I'm Gabriel Noone. Goodnight".

Cast

Production

In The Night Listener Revealed, an extra on the film's DVD release, Armistead Maupin discusses the inspiration for his novel. In 1992, the author was sent the manuscript of a memoir allegedly written by fourteen-year-old Anthony Godby Johnson, who had been sexually and physically abused by his parents since childhood. Since the galleys included a foreword by novelist Paul Monette, a close friend of Maupin, and an afterword by Fred Rogers of Mister Rogers' Neighborhood fame, he had no reason to doubt the story's veracity.

Maupin was impressed with the maturity of the boy's writing and called him. The two quickly developed a close telephone relationship, and Maupin frequently discussed the boy's various physical ailments (he had been diagnosed with AIDS) with his adopted mother, Vicki Johnson. Several months later, Maupin's then-lover Terry Anderson (who co-wrote the screenplay), who had spoken to the boy on occasion, had a conversation with his mother and was struck by how much she and the boy sounded alike. As he became increasingly suspicious about the situation, Maupin became more and more determined to believe the boy really existed. Only after Vicki repeatedly prevented him from visiting the boy did Maupin begin to think he was caught up in a scam.

Following the publication of the novel, a friend of Maupin's who wrote for The New Yorker instigated an investigation. The story was reported by 20/20, which revealed that the photo of "Anthony" that Vicki had sent to Anthony's supporters was a childhood photo of Steve Tarabokija, now a healthy adult and a New Jersey traffic engineer, who was shocked to find his photo being represented to people as the face of Anthony Godby Johnson.

Release

Box office
The film premiered at the Sundance Film Festival and was shown at the Berlin International Film Festival before opening on 1,367 screens in the US, earning $3,554,134 in its opening weekend. The film went on to gross $7,836,393 domestically and $2,785,502 in foreign markets for a total box office of $10,621,895.

Critical reception

A. O. Scott of The New York Times called the film a "well-meaning, flat-footed screen adaptation [that] has its creepy, suspenseful moments ... but it shrinks a rich, strange story to the dimensions of an anecdote ... the psychological and intellectual implications that hover over the story are lost in the spooky atmospherics and overshadowed by Ms. Collette's off-kilter showboating." Mick LaSalle of the San Francisco Chronicle described it as "a movie with lots of heart but no heartbeat ... it feels infected by a malaise ... yet the film has intelligence and integrity and cannot be dismissed." Michael Phillips of the Los Angeles Times said, "It's a small but crafty and well-acted picture ... The pacing and staging of the later scenes could use a little more electricity and momentum and a little less restraint. Yet The Night Listener keeps you watching. And listening." David Rooney of Variety thought it was "tediously solemn" and a "dawdling mystery thriller [that] manages to flatten two protagonists that had far more depth in the novel ... Lenser Lisa Rinzler gives the film a somber, elegant look, and Peter Nashel's score adds a layer of intensity. But it takes more than a few brooding strings to make a film taut and tense. The pace drags increasingly, trudging through the protracted final reels to a clumsy wrap-up with too many concluding scenes, none of them effective."

References

External links
 
 
 
 Film trailer
 Armistead Maupin interview

2006 films
2006 LGBT-related films
2000s mystery films
2006 psychological thriller films
American LGBT-related films
American psychological thriller films
Films about writers
Films about radio people
Films based on American novels
LGBT-related films based on actual events
Films set in New York City
Films set in Madison, Wisconsin
Films shot in New York (state)
Films shot in New Jersey
American mystery films
Films with screenplays by Armistead Maupin
Miramax films
IFC Films films
Fortissimo Films films
2000s English-language films
2000s American films